Ummendorf is a German toponym, it may refer to:

Ummendorf, Saxony-Anhalt
Ummendorf, Baden-Württemberg
Ummendorf district of the town Pürgen